The Jireh Bull Blockhouse (RI-926, also known as the Jireh Bull Garrison House or Jireh Bull Block House) is an historic archaeological site on Middlebridge Road in South Kingstown, Rhode Island.  In 1657 a blockhouse was built on the site by Jireh Bull, son of Rhode Island Governor Henry Bull. The stone garrison house was burned by the Native Americans in King Philip's War on December 15, 1675, and fifteen soldiers defending the fort were killed. The site was acquired by the Rhode Island Historical Society in 1925.

The site was added to the National Register of Historic Places in 1983.

See also
Henry Bull House
Capt. John Mawdsley House
National Register of Historic Places listings in Washington County, Rhode Island

References

Houses completed in 1657
Military facilities on the National Register of Historic Places in Rhode Island
Archaeological sites on the National Register of Historic Places in Rhode Island
Buildings and structures in South Kingstown, Rhode Island
1657 in Rhode Island
National Register of Historic Places in Washington County, Rhode Island
1657 establishments in Rhode Island
Blockhouses